Chandan Achar (born 2 August 1990) is an Indian theatre and film actor who works in Kannada. He is known for his works in movies including Kirik Party and Chemistry of Kariyappa. For his performance in the film Kirik Party, he got SIIMA award for Best Actor in Supporting Role (Male) in 2017. He was also a contestant in the reality show of Bigg Boss Kannada (season 7).

Early life
Born and raised in Krishnarajanagar Town, Mysore, Chandan was an alumnus student of Journalism and Mass Communication Department in Maharaja's College, Mysore. He got trained in Mandya Ramesh's  institute Natana.

Career
An active participant in drama and other activities in college days, Chandan first appeared in a small role in the Diganth starrer Kannada movie Parijatha in 2012. His first notable role was in the college drama Kirik Party in 2016. Then he acted in Mugulu Nage with Ganesh.

Chandan did his first movie as a lead in the 2019 movie ‛Chemistry of Kariyappa’. After Kirik Party, he again shared space with Rakshit Shetty in the multilingual Avane Srimannarayana. His next solo venture was Mangalavara Rajaadina which was released in March 2020.

Chandan was also a part of the popular reality show Bigg Boss Kannada (season 7) where he was a contestant and got evicted on the 99th day of the show.

Filmography

As actor

As singer

Awards

References

External links

Male actors in Kannada cinema
21st-century Indian male actors
People from Karnataka
Living people
1993 births